Alfons Standaert (24 December 1894 – 2 April 1968) was a Belgian racing cyclist. He rode in the 1922 Tour de France.

References

1894 births
1968 deaths
Belgian male cyclists
Place of birth missing